Helmut Qualtinger (8 October 1928 – 29 September 1986; alt. sp.: Helmuth Qualtinger; birthname: Helmut Gustav Friedrich Qualtinger) was an actor, writer, reciter and cabaret performer.

Biography
He was born Helmut Gustav Friedrich Qualtinger in Vienna, First Austrian Republic to a secondary education teacher and his wife, stemming from the bourgeoise class of the Bildungsbürgertum, his father being a follower of the German Nazi movement. While at school Qualtinger's interest in literature and acting became obvious and he founded a youth theater as a pupil. Afterwards he initially studied medicine and literature, but quit university to become a newspaper reporter and film critic for local press, while beginning to write his own texts for cabaret performances and theater plays. Qualtinger continued as an actor at student theaters and revues and attended the Max Reinhardt Seminar as a guest student.

Cabaret
Beginning in 1947, he appeared in cabaret performances.  In 1949, Qualtinger's first theatrical play, Jugend vor den Schranken (Youth in front of Barriers), was staged in Graz and caused furor for portraying teenagers and their rebellious behaviour. Up to 1961, Qualtinger collaborated on various cabaret programmes with the Namenlosen Ensemble (Nameless Ensemble, founded 1952) made up of Gerhard Bronner, Carl Merz, Louise Martini, Peter Wehle, Georg Kreisler, and Michael Kehlmann. He also continued to write commentaries, mostly satirical, for Austrian news papers e.g. from 1955 to 1961 for the Kurier together with his acting colleague Carl Merz.

The chansons presented in these cabaret revues, for example „Papa wird's scho richten“ (Daddy's gonna fix it), and his „Travnicek dialogs“ with Bronner became (in)famous to the history of Austrian cabaret. Mr. Travnicek is a typical little man character, mostly in a bad mood. He is asked questions only to reveal his odd, sometimes misanthropic views on things going on.

Acting
Qualtinger also played several serious theater, TV and film parts, the film Kurzer Prozess and the Alpensaga TV series were among those well received.

The short one-man play Der Herr Karl, which was written by Qualtinger and Merz, broadcast on Austrian TV in 1961 with Qualtinger playing the lead character and later on also performed on stage, made him well known across German-speaking countries. "Herr Karl", a grocery store clerk, is telling the story of his life and deeds to an imaginary colleague (the camera/spectator) – from the days of the First Austrian Republic after the end of the Habsburg empire (1918), leading up to the transformation into the Austrofascist regime (1934) and the Anschluss (annexation) by Nazi Germany (1938), followed by World War II and finally the occupation by Allied forces until the mid-1950s, seen from the perspective of one who is a prototypical opportunist. Qualtinger's portrayal of the petit-bourgeois collaborator came at a time when "normality" had just been restored and involvement of Austrians in the fascist and later Nazi movements was being downplayed and wished to be "forgotten", causing a stir and many enemies for the authors, Qualtinger even received anonymous threats of murder for his part as "Mr. Everyman" as a hanger-on.

Already seriously ill, he made his final acting appearance in 1986 as the heretic monk "Remigio da Varagine" in The Name of the Rose, along with Sean Connery and F. Murray Abraham.

Recitations
Beginning with the 1970s, Qualtinger frequently performed recital tours of his own and other texts, including excerpts from Adolf Hitler's Mein Kampf and Karl Kraus' Die letzten Tage der Menschheit (The Last Days of Mankind). His recitals were very popular and resulted in several records being published.

Pranks
Qualtinger was also known for his, sometimes crude, practical jokes. In May 1945 just as the Second World War had ended he staged a confiscation of a mansion as an "appointed Commissioner for Culture", using a self-signed letter of authorization and a "Soviet Star" symbol on his clothing for legitimation. Qualtinger intended to found a theater and was about to recruit actors when his coup was uncovered and he was jailed for three months by the Soviet occupation force.

In 1951, he managed to launch a false report in several newspapers, a so-called canard (germ. "Zeitungsente"), announcing the visit of a (fictional) famous Inuit poet named Kobuk (author of "The Burning Igloo") to Vienna. Reporters who assembled at the railway station however were to witness the "Inuit poet", in fur coat and cap, stepping from the train. Asked about his "first impressions of Vienna", Qualtinger commented in broad Viennese dialect, "Haaß is's do (It's hot here)!"

Helmut Qualtinger died in Vienna on 29 September 1986, of a liver condition.

Filmography

External links

1928 births
1986 deaths
Austrian male film actors
Austrian male stage actors
Austrian male television actors
Austrian male writers
Burials at the Vienna Central Cemetery
Kabarettists
Writers from Vienna
Male actors from Vienna
Deaths from liver disease
20th-century Austrian male actors
German Film Award winners